Frederick William Kacher (born 1968) is a United States Navy rear admiral who serves as the vice director for operations of the Joint Staff. He most previously served as the assistant deputy chief of naval operations for operations, plans, and strategy of the United States Navy from May 25, 2021, to June 2022. Prior to that, he served as the Commander of Expeditionary Strike Group 7.

Raised in Oakton, Virginia, Kacher graduated from the United States Naval Academy in 1990 with a B.S. degree in English. He later earned a Master of Public Policy degree with a concentration in international relations from the Kennedy School at Harvard University.

Kacher is the author of the "Newly Commissioned Naval Officer's Guide" (first edition 2009, second edition 2018) and co-author with fellow Naval Academy alumnus Douglas Robb of the "Naval Officer's Guide to the Pentagon" (2019).

Military career
In June 2022, Kacher was assigned as vice director for operations of the Joint Staff.

In January 2023, Kacher was nominated for promotion to vice admiral and assignment as commander of the United States Seventh Fleet.

References

External links
 

1968 births
Living people
Place of birth missing (living people)
People from Oakton, Virginia
United States Naval Academy alumni
Harvard Kennedy School alumni
American male non-fiction writers
Recipients of the Legion of Merit
United States Navy admirals